Juana (Juanita) Parra (born 19 November 1970) is a Chilean musician, known as the drummer and percussionist of the Chilean rock band Los Jaivas.

She is the daughter of Gabriel Parra, and Eugenia Correa. Gabriel was the original drummer of Chilean progressive rock–folk group Los Jaivas. He died in a crash in Peru in 1988.

Juanita joined the band as the drummer after her father's death. Her first CD with the band was Hijos de la tierra in 1995.

References

1970 births
Living people
Chilean musicians
Women drummers
21st-century women musicians
21st-century drummers
Chilean drummers